Alexander Rustemov (born July 6, 1973) is a Russian chess grandmaster and trainer. He gained the grandmaster title in 1998 and finished second in the 2000 Russian Chess Championship. Rustemov is an experienced internet blitz player, having played the Dutch grandmaster Loek van Wely in a 137-game blitz match on the ICC, the final score of which was 67½–71½ to van Wely. He is part of the Schachverein Wattenscheid chess club.

References

External links

 
 
 Alexander Rustemov player profile at 365chess.com

Chess grandmasters
Russian chess players
1973 births
Living people
People from Murmansk